Lady Maria Bell (née Hamilton; 26 December 17559 March 1825) was an English amateur painter (in oils) and sculptor.

Life
Maria Hamilton was born in Chelsea, London, the daughter of William Hamilton, an architect from a Scottish family, and his wife Sarah. She was the pupil of her brother William Hamilton RA. She also received instruction from Sir Joshua Reynolds, whose pictures she copied with much skill. She copied likewise the works of Rubens at Carlton House, including the 'Holy Family,' which was highly commended.

Around 1808 she married Sir Thomas Bell (1751-1824), leather merchant and later sheriff of London, who was knighted in 1816, and whose portrait was engraved by William Dickinson after a painting by her. Between the years 1809 and 1824 she exhibited at the Royal Academy and elsewhere several figure-subjects and portraits, among the latter being in 1816 those of Sir Matthew Wood, 1st Baronet, lord mayor of London, and of her husband. She also practised modelling, exhibiting two busts at the Royal Academy in 1819.

Lady Bell died in Dean Street, Soho, in 1825.

Her own portrait was engraved by Edward Scriven from a miniature by W. S. Lethbridge.

See also
English women painters from the early 19th century who exhibited at the Royal Academy of Art

 Sophie Gengembre Anderson
 Mary Baker
 Ann Charlotte Bartholomew
 Barbara Bodichon
 Joanna Mary Boyce
 Margaret Sarah Carpenter
 Fanny Corbaux
 Rosa Corder
 Mary Ellen Edwards
 Harriet Gouldsmith
 Mary Harrison (artist)
 Jane Benham Hay
 Anna Mary Howitt
 Mary Moser
 Martha Darley Mutrie
 Ann Mary Newton
 Emily Mary Osborn
 Kate Perugini
 Louise Rayner
 Ellen Sharples
 Rolinda Sharples
 Rebecca Solomon
 Elizabeth Emma Soyer
 Isabelle de Steiger
 Henrietta Ward

References

1755 births
1825 deaths
19th-century English painters
English women painters
19th-century British women artists
19th-century English women